Dany Morin (born December 19, 1985) is a Canadian businessman and former politician, who served in the House of Commons of Canada from 2011 to 2015. He represented the electoral district of Chicoutimi—Le Fjord as a member of the New Democratic Party.

A chiropractor, he was one of five openly gay candidates elected to Parliament in the 2011 election. He served as the NDP associate critic for lesbian, gay, bisexual, transgender, and transsexual issues, alongside lead critic Randall Garrison.

Morin was defeated in the 2015 election by Liberal Denis Lemieux. Following his electoral defeat, he launched Monsieur Fulgence, an e-commerce project to promote local artisans and craftspeople from the Saguenay–Lac-Saint-Jean region.

References

External links

Members of the House of Commons of Canada from Quebec
New Democratic Party MPs
Businesspeople from Quebec
Politicians from Saguenay, Quebec
Canadian LGBT Members of Parliament
Canadian LGBT businesspeople
Gay politicians
Living people
1985 births
21st-century Canadian politicians
21st-century Canadian LGBT people
Canadian gay men